Le Lapérouse is the lead ship of the  of cruise ships operated by Ponant.  Each member of the class has been allocated the name of a famous French explorer, and Le Lapérouse is named after naval officer Jean-François de Galaup, comte de Lapérouse.

History
Built by VARD, Le Lapérouse had her keel laid down at VARD's Tulcea yard in Romania on 1 March 2017.  She was floated out on 18 December 2017, and was then finally outfitted at the builder's Søviknes facility in Ålesund, Norway.  After successful sea trials that began in May 2018, she was delivered to Ponant in Ålesund on 15 June 2018.

The following day, 16 June 2018, Le Lapérouse departed for Reykjavík, Iceland, where she commenced her maiden cruise on 19 June 2018.  She was christened by Maryvonne Pinault, the wife of French billionaire businessman François Pinault, at a ceremony in Hafnarfjörður, Iceland, on 10 July 2018.

2021: New Zealand
In late January 2021, it was reported the New Zealand-based tourism company Wild Earth Travel had chartered Le Lapérouse to run small expeditions around the country commencing 30 January. The cruise ship applied for visa exemptions to enter New Zealand due to COVID-19 border restrictions. While Immigration New Zealand granted the ship and essential crew visa exemptions, 60 hospitality staff were denied visa exemptions on the grounds that they needed to hire New Zealanders. Though the hospitality crew were denied visa exemptions twice, Le Lapérouse still sailed for New Zealand. In response to media interest, Immigration Minister Kris Faafoi defended Immigration New Zealand's decision, stating that Le Lapérouse should have waited for the department to process its crew's visa applications before sailing for New Zealand. The ship was instructed to return its hospitality crew to New Caledonia in order to re-enter New Zealand.

References

External links

 Compagnie du Ponant official site page about the ship

2017 ships
Ships built in Norway
Ships built in Romania
Ships of Compagnie du Ponant